Tris(2-chloroethyl) phosphate (TCEP) is a chemical compound used as a flame retardant, plasticizer, and viscosity regulator in various types of polymers including polyurethanes, polyester resins, and polyacrylates.

Safety
Because of its suspected reproductive toxicity, it is listed as a substance of very high concern under the European Union's REACH regulations.

See also
 Tris(2,3-dibromopropyl) phosphate

References

Organophosphates
Organochlorides
Flame retardants
Chloroethyl compounds